Welat Cagro (born 31 May 1999) is a Belgian professional footballer who last played as a midfielder for Eerste Divisie club NAC Breda.

Career

Early career
Born in Schaerbeek, Brussels, to Kurdish parents, Cagro began playing football with his local club, where he was scouted by Anderlecht. Afterwards, he also played in the youth academies of Mechelen and Oud-Heverlee Leuven, where he left in 2016 sign for Gent, joining their youth teams.

Urartu
After failing to break through to Gent's first team, Cagro signed for Armenian Premier League club Urartu in 2019. He made his professional debut on 3 March 2019 in a 1–1 away draw against Noah, coming on as a substitute for Pape Abdou Camara. He made a total of 10 appearances for Urartu.

Telstar
For the second half of 2019–20, he signed for Dutch second division club Telstar. He made his first appearance for the club on 28 February 2019, coming on as a substitute in the 81st minute of a 2–2 draw against Jong Ajax, replacing Rashaan Fernandes. The competition was shortly after suspended and since cancelled due to the COVID-19, which meant that he only made one appearance for the club that season.

On 19 October 2020, Cagro scored his first professional goal, securing a 1–1 draw against Roda JC Kerkrade on a converted penalty kick shortly before full-time. He had replaced Sven van Doorm only seven minutes earlier. At the end of the season, he had made 28 appearances in which he scored once, as his contract with Telstar expired.

NAC Breda
In November 2021, Cagro signed with NAC Breda after a successful trial. On 19 November, he made his debut for the club in a 1–1 draw against Jong FC Utrecht in the Eerste Divisie, replacing Jarchinio Antonia at half-time.

Cagro's contract with NAC was terminated by mutual consent on 19 March 2023.

References

External links
 
 

1999 births
Living people
People from Schaerbeek
Footballers from Brussels
Belgian footballers
Association football midfielders
R.S.C. Anderlecht players
K.V. Mechelen players
Oud-Heverlee Leuven players
K.A.A. Gent players
FC Urartu players
SC Telstar players
NAC Breda players
Armenian Premier League players
Eerste Divisie players
Belgian expatriate footballers
Belgian expatriate sportspeople in Armenia
Belgian expatriate sportspeople in the Netherlands
Expatriate footballers in Armenia
Expatriate footballers in the Netherlands
Belgian people of Kurdish descent